Haxby is a town in North Yorkshire, England.

Haxby may also  refer to

Places 
Haxby, Illinois, town now known as Effner

People 
James V. Haxby (born 1951), American neuroscientist
Thomas Haxby (1729-1796), English musical instrument maker

Other 
Haxby & Gillespie, architectural firm in North Dakota